Nicolas Puzos (1686–1753) was a French obstetrician in the 18th century.

Puzos first started in medical studies in 1702 when his father sent him as an aide-major with the French army so he could learn surgery.  He next studied under Julien Clément.

Morisot-Deslandes posthumously published Puzos notes as Traité des Accouchements de M. Puzos in 1759.

Among other things Puzos is cited for his view that patients in childbirth should be bled.

References

Further reading

External links 
 Puzos N, Mémoires sur les pertes de sang et le lait répandu, ou dépôts laiteux, 2nd ed., 1801

1686 births
1753 deaths
French obstetricians